The 2004 Rink Hockey Men's B World Championship was the 36th edition of the Rink Hockey B World Championship, held from October 16 to 23, in Macau. 

The champion was Catalonia, that had obtained a FIRS provisional membership few months before the tournament. However, FIRS did not endorse final acceptance of Catalonia for subsequent editions.

Format
Competition's schedule included 11 countries, divided in two groups, but North Korea withdrew a few days before the opening.

Matches
All times are Macau local time (UTC+8).

Group stage

Group A

Group B

9th and 10th places

5th place bracket

Championship Knockout stage

Final standings

B
Rink Hockey Men's B World Championship
Men's B World Championship
International sports competitions hosted by Macau
Roller hockey in Macau
International roller hockey competitions hosted by China